Pance may refer to:
Places
 Pance River, Colombia
Pancé, France
Pance, Ljubljana, Slovenia

Acronyms
Physician Assistant National Certifying Exam (PANCE)